Balkow may refer to:
Balków, Łódź Voivodeship, Poland
Bałków, Świętokrzyskie Voivodeship, Poland